Ekaterina is a 2014 Russia-1 historical television series starring Marina Aleksandrova as the eventual Russian empress Catherine the Great. The first season tells the story of princess Sophie Friederike Auguste, and her rise to power to become Empress of Russia, following a coup d'état and the assassination of her husband, Peter III. The second season portrays the challenges she faces at home and abroad during the early years of her rule, as she tries to revitalise Russia to become one of the great powers of Europe, and becomes titled "the Great".

The first season premiered on November 24, 2014 on Russia-1, and was released on Amazon in 2017 under the title Ekaterina: The Rise of Catherine the Great. The second season premiered on Russia-1 on February 27, 2017, and was released on Amazon in 2018. The series premiered its third season on October 21, 2019.

Plot summary

Season 1: Catherine (2014)
Motto – «I will reign… otherwise I will perish…»

In 1744 in Saint Petersburg, Empress Elizabeth is childless, and she appoints her nephew Peter Fedorovich as the heir to the Russian throne. But he had been born in Prussia and could hardly speak Russian.

Elizabeth decides to marry him to a princess, intending to take any future son and educate him to become the future emperor. Elizabeth chooses a wife for her nephew, German Princess Sophie Friederike Auguste von Anhalt-Zerbst-Dornburg. Sophia Frederike hopes to find happiness in the distant and foreign land, but she is faced with the intrigues and plots of the Russian Imperial court, the indifference of her husband, and the plans of the Empress. The girl takes the name Catherine Alexeevna (Yekaterina) and works to save herself and her children from danger, as the emperor Peter III desires to send her away from the palace.

In July 1762, barely six months after becoming emperor, Peter commits the political error of retiring with his Holstein-born courtiers and relatives to Oranienbaum, leaving his wife in Saint Petersburg. On July 8 and 9, the Leib Guard revolts, deposes Peter from power, and proclaims Catherine as the new monarch. The bloodless coup d'état succeeds and Catherine becomes the new empress, and thus the Golden Age of the Russian Empire begins.

Season 2: The Rise of Catherine (2017)
Motto – «She ascended the throne to become Great!»

1768. Catherine has ruled Russia for six years. A dangerous prospect of war with Turkey is looming. At the same time, Catherine is looking for a way to legally marry her longtime favorite Grigory Orlov and legitimize their common son Alexey, to make him heir to the throne in case Pavel Petrovich (the son of Catherine II and Peter III) remains childless.

However, Orlov’s cheeky and unpredictable behavior, as well as his problems with male health, make the empress abandon her thought of marriage and send her son Alexey abroad. Having thrown Pavel Petrovich into the arms of her maid of honor, Sofia Stepanovna, the Empress makes sure that Pavel Petrovich can have children. Having got rid of Orlov, Catherine falls in love with the guard Grigory Potemkin and finds in Europe a bride for Pavel Petrovich, Wilhelmina Louisa of Hesse-Darmstadt.

1774. The Russo-Turkish war ends with a victory for Russia, which establishes its protectorate over the Crimean Khanate and gets access to the Black and Azov Seas.

1776. Pavel Petrovich marries for the second time to the Duchess Sophie Dorothea of Württemberg, while Catherine marries Potemkin, who in her honor establishes the city of Yekaterinoslav in the south of the empire.

1780. Catherine releases the Braunschweig family, children of the Duke Anton Ulrich – the great-grandchildren of Peter The Great's brother, from prison. They sail to Denmark.

1782. Catherine opens a statue of Peter the Great in St. Petersburg and sends Pavel Petrovich with his wife and children on a trip to Europe.

Season 3: Catherine. Impostors (2019)
Motto – «Russia is waiting… I won't let anyone stop me!»

Note: This season takes place between the 11th and 12th episode of the second season, from 1774 to 1776.

1774. The rule of the great and mighty Ekaterina is threatened. The Russo-Turkish War continues, draining the Empire's treasury. Numerous pretenders appear with claims to the throne. The Peasants' War is in full swing – a war led by Yemelyan Pugachev, who passed himself off as Peter III. There is danger brewing inside the palace, too: the noblemen want to pass the throne on to her oldest son, Paul. Ekaterina's personal life is troubled. She has lost hope of having a child with Prince Potemkin. She has new love interests, new favorites. But the biggest and most important love of the Empress is Russia itself. Ekaterina has to make decisions that determine the fate of her throne and her empire.

Prequel: Elizabeth (2022)
The prequel tells the story of the Empress Elizabeth, daughter of Peter I, who was all but 16 years old, when her father died and left her to govern her immense empire. For Elizabeth, her throne became a living hell: against her will the young girl was pulled into court intrigues, where she is opposed by notable members of the court such as Andrei Ivanovich Osterman, Aleksandre Danielovich Meshikov, and even her own mother Catherine the First.

Cast

Catherine the Great

Main
Marina Alexandrova as Princess Sophie of Anhalt-Zerbst / Her Highness Ekaterina Alekseyevna / Empress Catherine the Great
Julia Aug as Empress Elizaveta Petrovna [series 1; 2–3 — flashbacks only]
Aleksandr Yatsenko as His Highness Pyotr Fyodorovich / Emperor Peter III [series 1; 2–3 — flashbacks only]
Pavel Tabakov as His Highness Pavel Petrovich [series 2–3]
Vladimir Menshov as Count / Graf Alexey Bestuzhev-Ryumin [series 1]
Konstantin Lavronenko as Count / Graf Johann Lestocq [series 1]
Alexander Lazarev Jr. as Count / Graf Alexey Razumovsky [series 1]
Nikolay Kozak as Count / Graf Alexander Shuvalov [series 1]
Rinal Mukhametov as Count Sergey Saltykov [series 1; 2 – flashbacks only]
Sergey Strelnikov as captain Grigory Orlov [series 1]
Sergey Marin as Count / Graf Grigory Orlov [series 2–3]
Mikhail Gavrilov as Alexey Orlov [series 1]
Artyom Alekseev as Count / Graf Alexey Orlov [series 2–3]
Kirill Rubtsov [series 1] / Igor Sklyar [series 2–3] as Ivan Betskoy 
Vladimir Yaglych as Grigory Potemkin [series 2–3]
Sergey Koltakov as chancellor Nikita Panin [series 2–3]
Mikhail Gorevoy as privy councillor Stepan Sheshkovsky [series 2–3]
Stanislav Strelkov as cabinet secretary Adam Olsufyev [series 2–3]
Alina Tomnikov as Princess Wilhelmina of Hesse-Darmstadt / Her Higness Natalya Alexeyevna [series 2–3]
Artur Ivanov as Yemelyan Pugachev [series 3]
Angelina Strechina as Princess Tarakanova [series 3]

Recurring cast

Series 1
Isabelle Schosing as Joanna Elisabeth of Holstein-Gottorp, mother of Catherine The Great
Vitaly Kravchenko as Generalfeldmarschall Stepan Apraksin
Elena Shamova as Gemma, a servant
Ivan Dobronravov as Pimen, a servant / medicus
Svetlana Korchagina as Matryona, a servant
Alexey Vorobyov as Count Stanisław August Poniatowski [series 1]
Marcin Stec as King Stanisław August Poniatowski [series 2]:
Jacub Snochowski as Krzysztof Piecki, a valet of Stanisław Poniatowski [series 2]
Maxim Kerin as Brockdorff, a valet of Peter III
Hartmouth Krug [series 1] / Stass Klassen [series 2] as King Frederick II:
Yury Maslak as General Hans Joachim von Zieten
Vitas Eisenach as Axel von Mardefeld, a Prussian ambassador
Patrick Rouille Rollin as Marquis de La Chétardie, a French ambassador
Pavel Vorozhtsov as Mikhail Lomonosov
Polina Lazareva as Countess Yekaterina Vorontsova-Dashkova, a favorite of Peter III
Valentina Talyzina as nursemaid of ex-emperor Ivan Antonovich
Alexander Baluev as voice-off

Series 2
Lyubava Greshnova as lady-in-waiting Sophia Razumovskaya [series 2–3]
Rodion Galyuchenko as Count Petr Razumovsky [series 2–3]
Alexander Bulatov as Alexey Grigoryevich, son of Catherine The Great and Grigory Orlov [series 2; 3 — flashbacks only]
Anton Denisenko as Semyon Poroshin, a teacher of Pavel Petrovich [series 2; 3 — flashbacks only]
Marina Mitrofanova as lady-in-waiting Anna Sheremeteva [series 2; 3 — flashbacks only]
Igor Balalayev as Alexander Suvorov [series 2–3]
George Devdariani as medicus George Rogerson (inspired by John Samuel Rogerson and Thomas Dimsdale)
Alexander Tkachev as Count Andrey Razumovsky, a lover of Natalya Alexeyevna [series 2–3]
Leonid Kulagin as archbishop Gavriil
Alexandra Ursulyak as Darya Saltykova / Saltychikha
Tatyana Lyalina as Princess Sophie Dorothea of Württemberg / Her Highness Maria Fyodorovna, 2nd wife of Pavel Petrovich
Sergey Yushkevich as ambassador Count / Graf Alexey Obreskov
Andrey Zaykov [series 2] / Alexander Nazarov [series 3] as Count / Graf Ivan Yelagin
Alexander Smirnov as Grigory Teplov
Andrey Gusev as Lev Naryshkin
Alexander Oleshko as painter Fyodor Rokotov
Vladimir Yumatov as Count / Graf Petr Sheremetev
Sergey Larin as Nikolay Saltykov
Andrey Rudensky as Duke Anthony Ulrich of Brunswick:
Anastasia Tsibizova as Catherine Antonovna of Brunswick
Kristina Boreyko as Elizabeth Antonovna of Brunswick
Alexey Khodokevich as Alexey Antonovich of Brunswick
Maxim Kudryavtsev as Peter Antonovich of Brunswick
Alexey Usoltsev as Ivan Kulibin
Samvel Muzhikyan as Sultan Mustafa III
Sayat Abadzhyan as Ottoman ambassador Ćaner
Ivan Agapov as medicus Pinkus
Oleg Zima [series 2] / Igor Golovin [series 3] as Count / Graf Kirill Razumovsky
Alena Olkina as Princess Amalie of Hesse-Darmstadt
Elizaveta Arzamasova as Princess Louise of Hesse-Darmstadt
Alexander Vorobyov as Vasily Shkurin, an educator of Alexey Grigoryevich
Ola Keiro as Luka, a valet of Pavel Petrovich [series 2–3]
Maxim Vazhov as Vlas, a servant of Nikita Panin [series 2–3]

Series 3
Danila Dunayev as poet Gavrila Derzhavin
Diana Milyutina as Yekaterina Nelidova, a lady-in-waiting of Natalya Alexeyevna
Igor Garbuzov as Lefebvre
Artyom Kretov as Kazimierz Ogiński
Daniil Slutsky as Michał Ogiński
Olga Makeyeva as Maria Carolina of Austria
Sergey Tessler as Ferdinand I of the Two Sicilies
Kuzma Saprykin as playwright Denis Fonvizin
Semyon Lopatin as Ivan Bludov
Sergey Barkovsky as Count / Graf Petr Panin
Sergey Goroshko as Anatole Gartenberg
Monica Gossmann as Gertrude
Vasilisa Izmaylova as Viola Yelagina
Dmitry Giryov as Chumak
Vladimir Antonik as voice-off

Episodes

Series overview
<onlyinclude>

Series 1 (2014)

Series 2: The Rise of Catherine (2017)

Series 3: Impostors (2019)
<onlyinclude>

Reception
The series has received praise for its acting and costume design, and the first season won Russia's Golden Eagle award for "best television series". A review at Eclectic Pop described it as "a vivid and beautifully crafted series replete with lavish costumes and a stirring musical score". Writing for BroadwayWorld, Robert Kahn described the series as "gloriously filmed" and added: "The story of Catherine's rise to power rivals any contemporary soap opera, as an intricate web of politics, adultery and betrayal unfolds within the Russian court in spectacular fashion."

During the broadcast, the series held the top spot for film and television series ratings in Russia, and became one of the most popular TV series in the Russian Federation.

Release

Season one, with English subtitles and reformatted into ten episodes, was released by Amazon Prime in June 2017. This drama also aired in Pakistan on filmazia, dubbed in Urdu.

See also
Catherine the Great, Channel One Russia's version
Catherine the Great, HBO's miniseries version

References

External links
Official Website

Russia-1 original programming
2014 television films
2010s Russian television series
2014 Russian television series debuts
Russian-language television shows
Serial drama television series
Television series set in the 18th century
Historical television series
Russian political television series
Television series based on actual events
Russian television miniseries
Russian drama television series
Depictions of Catherine the Great on television
Television shows set in Saint Petersburg
Biographical films about Russian royalty
Cultural depictions of Peter III of Russia
Russian biographical television series